The cup is a cooking measure of volume, commonly associated with cooking and serving sizes. Because actual drinking cups may differ greatly from the size of this unit, standard measuring cups may be used, with a metric cup being 250 millilitres.

United States

Customary cup

In the United States, the customary cup is half of a liquid pint.

Legal cup
The cup currently used in the United States for nutrition labelling is defined in United States law as 240 ml.

Conversion table to US Legal cup
The following information is describing that how to measure US Legal Cup in different ways.

Coffee cup

A "cup" of coffee in the US is usually 4 fluid ounces (118 ml), brewed using 5 fluid ounces (148 ml) of water. Coffee carafes used with drip coffee makers, e.g. Black and Decker models, have markings for both water and brewed coffee as the carafe is also used for measuring water prior to brewing.  A 12-cup carafe, for example, has markings for 4, 6, 8, 10, and 12 cups of water or coffee, which correspond to 20, 30, 40, 50, and 60 US fluid ounces (0.59, 0.89, 1.18, 1.48, and 1.77 litres) of water or 16, 24, 32, 40, and 48 US fluid ounces (0.47, 0.71, 0.95, 1.18, and 1.42 litres) of brewed coffee respectively, the difference being the volume absorbed by the coffee grounds and lost to evaporation during brewing.

Commonwealth of Nations

Metric cup
Australia, Canada, New Zealand, and some other members of the Commonwealth of Nations, being former British colonies that have since metricated, employ a "metric cup" of 250millilitres. Although derived from the metric system, it is not an SI unit.

A "coffee cup" is 1.5 dL (i.e. 150 millilitres or 5.07 US customary fluid ounces), and is occasionally used in recipes; in older recipes, cup may mean "coffee cup". It is also used in the US to specify coffeemaker sizes (what can be referred to as a Tasse à café). A "12-cup" US coffeemaker makes 57.6 US customary fluid ounces of coffee, which is equal to 6.8 metric cups of coffee.

Canadian cup
Canada now usually employs the metric cup of 250ml, but its conventional cup was somewhat smaller than both American and imperial units.

1 Canadian cup = 8 imperial fluid ounces =  imperial gallon = 

1 tablespoon   = 

1 teaspoon     =

United Kingdom

In the United Kingdom the standard cup was set at 10 imperial fluid ounces, or half an imperial pint. The cup was rarely used in practice, as historically most kitchens tended to be equipped with scales and ingredients were measured by weight, rather than volume. A related measure, the gill (5 fluid ounces, or half an imperial cup), was commonly used in older cookbooks for liquids, and may still be used (in fractions of 1/4, 1/5 and 1/6) for spirits.

International

Latin American cup
In Latin America, the amount of a "cup" varies from country to country, using a cup of 200ml, 250ml, and the US legal or customary amount.

Japanese cup

The traditional Japanese unit equated with a "cup" size is the gō, legally equated with litres (≈180.4 ml) in 1891, and is still used for reckoning amounts of rice and sake. The Japanese later defined a "cup" as 200 ml.

Russian cup

Since metrication, the charka was informally redefined as 100 ml, acquiring a new name of "stopka" (related to the traditional Russian measurement unit "stopa"), while there are currently two widely used glass sizes of 250 and 200 ml.

Dry measure
In Europe, recipes normally weigh non-liquid ingredients in grams rather than measuring volume. For example, where an American recipe might specify "1 cup of sugar and 2 cups of milk", a European recipe might specify "200 g sugar and 500 ml of milk". A precise conversion between the two measures takes into account the density of the ingredients, and some recipes specify both weight and volume to facilitate this conversion. Many European measuring cups have markings that indicate the weight of common ingredients for a given volume.

See also
 Cooking weights and measures

Notes

References

Units of volume
Customary units of measurement in the United States
Imperial units
Metricated units
Alcohol measurement
Cooking weights and measures